Ethyllt ferch Cynan, also known as Ethil, was the daughter of King Cynan Dindaethwy ap Rhodri of Gwynedd.

Marriage
In 768 she was married to Gwriad ap Elidyr, although it is possible this was a later invention to legitimise the claims to Gwynedd of the descendants of Merfyn Frych. After the death of her father in 816, the throne was secured by her uncle Hywel ap Rhodri Molwynog.

8th-century Welsh women
Year of birth unknown
Year of death unknown